Scopula mendax is a moth of the  family Geometridae. It is found in the Nimba Range in Africa.

References

Moths described in 1954
mendax
Moths of Africa